The following is a list of prominent people who were born in or have lived in the Malaysian state of Sabah, or for whom Sabah is a significant part of their identity.

A 
 Abdul Gani Patail – Attorney General of Malaysia, born in Lahad Datu
 Abdul Ghapur Salleh – former member of parliament for Kalabakan, Tawau
 Abdul Mutalib Mohamed Daud – former chief editor of the news portal Sabahkini.net
 Abdul Rahim Bakri – member of parliament for Kudat
 Abdul Rahman Dahlan – former member of parliament for Kota Belud
 Adira – singer, born in Ranau
 Ahmad Koroh – 5th Governor of Sabah
 Ahmadshah Abdullah – 9th Governor of Sabah
 Alex Lim – swimmer, born in Sandakan
 Alto Linus – footballer, born in Keningau
 Amber Chia – model, actress, television personality and brand ambassador, born in Teluk Intan, Perak and spent her childhood in Tawau
 Andrew Sheng – Hong Kong Securities and Futures Commission (SFC) chairman, born in China and migrated to Sabah
 Anifah Aman – Malaysian Foreign Affairs minister
 Anthea Phillipps – British botanist, spent most of her life in Kota Kinabalu with her husband Anthony Lamb
 Anthony Lamb – British botanist, spent most of his life in Kota Kinabalu with his wife Anthea Phillipps
 Amelia Alicia Anscelly – badminton player, born in Kota Kinabalu
 Amir Kahar – state assemblymen for Banggi
 Antanum – Murut historical warrior
 Awang Husaini Sahari – member of parliament for Putatan, Kota Kinabalu
 Azizah Mohd Dun – State Minister for Community Development and Consumer Affairs

B 
 Ben Leong – golfer
 Bernard Giluk Dompok – 11th Chief Minister of Sabah and Malaysian Ambassador to the Vatican City, born in Penampang
 Bobby Gonzales – footballer, born in Beaufort
 Brynn Zalina Lovett – Australian-Malaysian dancer and swimming instructor and winner of Miss World Malaysia 2015, born in Beaufort
 Bung Moktar Radin – member of parliament for Kinabatangan

C 
 Chan Foong Hin – member of parliament for Kota Kinabalu
 Che'Nelle – recording artist signed to Universal Music Japan, born in Putatan, Kota Kinabalu
 Christian Didier Chin – tennis player
 Christina Liew – member of parliament for Tawau as well the Sabah Deputy Chief Minister, born in Hong Kong and migrated to Sabah
 Chong Kah Kiat – 13th Chief Minister of Sabah, born in Kudat
 Chua Soon Bui – former member of parliament for Tawau
 Constantine Clement – weightlifter, born in Tambunan

D 
 Daphne Iking – television personality, emcee and occasional actress, born in Keningau
 Darell Leiking – member of parliament for Penampang, born in Penampang
 Dass Gregory Kolopis – footballer, born in Kota Belud
 David Wong Dak Wah – 5th Chief Judge of the High Court in Sabah and Sarawak
 Diana Angeles Ramirez Salvidar – Mexican veterinary, spent eight years working with Wildlife Rescue Unit (WRU) at the Danau Girang Field Centre on various projects including the collaring of elephants, clouded leopards, proboscis monkeys and crocodiles until her sudden death due to ingestion of substance in late 2018

E 
 Edmund Chong Ket Wah – former member of parliament for Batu Sapi, Sandakan, born in Sandakan
 Elizabeth Choy – Singaporean educator and councillor regarded as a war heroine, born in Kudat
 Elvin Chia – swimmer, born in Sandakan
 Eric Majimbun – member of parliament for Sepanggar, Kota Kinabalu, born in Inanam
 Esther Applunius – singer and songwriter, born in Tambunan
 Ewon Ebin – former Malaysian Science, Technology and Innovation minister

F 
 Fuad Stephens – 1st Chief Minister of Sabah, born in Kudat
 Fung Bo Bo – Hong Kong actress, born in Sandakan

G 
 Gabuh Piging – athletics, North Borneo Crown competitor at the 1956 Summer Olympics
 Gary Chaw – Taiwanese singer and songwriter, born in Kota Belud

H 
 Hajiji Noor – Politician,current Chief Minister of Sabah
 Harris Salleh – 6th Chief Minister of Sabah, born during Labuan was still part of North Borneo Crown
 Hassan Sani – footballer, born during Labuan was still part of North Borneo Crown
 Hiew King Cheu – former member of parliament for Luyang, Kota Kinabalu

I 
 Iain Steel – golfer
 Isnaraissah Munirah Majilis – member of parliament for Kota Belud, born in Kota Belud

J 
 James Wong – footballer, born in Kota Kinabalu
 Jeffrey Kitingan – member of parliament for Keningau as well the State Legislative Assembly for Bingkor, born in Kota Marudu
 Joey Ryan Gundok – footballer, born in Tuaran
 John Lee Hiong Fun-Yit Yaw – priest, born in Kota Kinabalu
 John Wong Soo Kau – priest, born in Sandakan
 Joseph Kurup – former member of parliament for Pensiangan and Minister in the Prime Minister's Department
 Joseph Pairin Kitingan – 7th Chief Minister of Sabah and Paramount Leader of Kadazan-Dusun Cultural Association (KDCA), born in Papar
 Juhar Mahiruddin – 10th Governor of Sabah, born in Tambisan Island, Sandakan
 Julamri Muhammad – footballer, born in Tawau
 Junior Eldstål – Malaysian-Swedish footballer, born in Kota Kinabalu
 Juslie Ajirol – former member of parliament for Libaran, Sandakan

K 
 K. A. Vanar – Sabah Indian Association President who was instrumental in getting Deepavali declared as a public holiday in the state
 Kasitah Gaddam – Malaysian Land and Cooperative Development minister
 Ken Shellito – English footballer and former Chelsea F.C. manager, spent most of his later life with his family in Inanam of Kota Kinabalu

L 
 Lajim Ukin – former member of parliament for Beaufort
 Leopold Alphonso – footballer
 Liew Vui Keong – former member of parliament for Sandakan
 Linda Tsen – former member of parliament for Batu Sapi, Sandakan

M 
 Mafry Balang – footballer, born in Sipitang
 Marcus Mojigoh – former member of parliament for Putatan, born in Putatan
 Marsha Milan Londoh – singer and actress, born in Berrien Springs, Michigan, United States and spent her adulthood in Kota Kinabalu
 Mary Yap Kain Ching – former member of parliament for Tawau
 Mat Salleh – Bajau/Suluk historical warrior
 Matlan Marjan – footballer, brother of Zainizam Marjan, born in Kota Belud
 Matthew Davies
 Matthew William – cricketer, born in Kota Kinabalu
 Maximus Ongkili – former member of parliament for Kota Marudu as well Malaysian Energy, Green Technology and Water minister
 Mohammad Said Keruak – 9th Governor of Sabah and 4th Chief Minister of Sabah, born in Kota Belud
 Mohamad Adnan Robert – 6th Governor of Sabah
 Mohd Hamdan Abdullah – 4th Governor of Sabah
 Mohd Reithaudin Awang Emran – footballer, born in Lahad Datu
 Monsopiad – Kadazan-Dusun historical warrior
 Musa Aman – 14th Chief Minister of Sabah, born in Beaufort
 Mustapha Harun – 1st Governor of Sabah and 3rd Chief Minister of Sabah, born in Kudat
 M. Sivakumar – footballer

N 
 Nikki – singer and actress, born in Berrien Springs, Michigan, United States and spent her adulthood in Tambunan

O 
 Osu Sukam – 12th Chief Minister of Sabah, born in Papar

P 
 Pandikar Amin Mulia – Speaker of the House of Representatives, born in Kota Belud
 Patricia Yapp Syau Yin – Royal Malaysian Air Force (RMAF) MiG-29 female pilot, born in Sandakan
 Pengiran Ahmad Raffae – 2nd Governor of Sabah
 Penny Wong – Australian politician, born in Kota Kinabalu
 Pete Teo – singer songwriter, film composer and filmmaker, born in Tawau
 Peter Joinud Mojuntin – politician, born in Penampang
 Peter Lo Sui Yin – 2nd Chief Minister of Sabah, born in Sandakan
 Peter Pragas – composer and musician
 Peter Rajah – footballer, born in Sandakan
 Philip Lee Tau Sang – member of the Advisory Council of North Borneo (1947–1950), the Legislative Council of North Borneo (1950–1958) and the Executive Council of North Borneo (1950–1953, 1956–1957)

Q

R 
 Radzi Mohd Hussin – footballer, born in Beaufort
 Rafiuddin Roddin – footballer, born in Tawau
 Raime Unggi – former member of parliament for Tenom, born in Tenom
 Ramlee Awang Murshid – novelist, born in Papar
 Randy Baruh - footballer, born in Sipitang.
 Rayzam Shah Wan Sofian – athletics, born in Keningau
 Razlan Oto – footballer, born in Sandakan
 Red Hong Yi – architectural designer artist, born in Kota Kinabalu
 Rezuan Khan Ahman – footballer, born in Kota Kinabalu
 Richard Malanjum – 9th Chief Justice of Malaysia and the 4th Chief Judge of the High Court in Sabah and Sarawak
 Rita Gani – football referee
 Robbi Sapinggi – former mountain guide
 Robson Rendy Rining - footballer, born in Sipitang 
 Ronald Kiandee – member of parliament for Beluran
 Ronny Harun – footballer, born in Sipitang
 Rosdin Wasli – footballer, born in Petagas, Kota Kinabalu
 Rosnah Shirlin – Malaysian Deputy Minister of Works and member of parliament for Papar, born in Kota Belud
 Rozaimi Abdul Rahman – footballer, born in Bongawan, Papar

S 
 Sakaran Dandai – 8th Governor of Sabah and 8th Chief Minister of Sabah, born in Kampung Air, Semporna
 Salleh Kalbi – former member of parliament for Silam, Lahad Datu
 Salleh Said Keruak – Malaysian Communication and Multimedia minister
 Sannatasah Saniru – badminton player
 Sapawi Ahmad – former member of parliament for Sipitang, born in Sipitang
 Sedomon Gunsanad Kina – native chief for Keningau
 Shafie Apdal – 15th Chief Minister of Sabah, born in Semporna
 Shahran Abdul Samad – footballer, born in Sandakan
 Shahrul Azhar Ture – footballer
 Siringan Gubat – former member of parliament for Ranau, born in Ranau
 Siswanto Haidi – cricketer, born in Tawau
 Sium Bin Diau – athletics, North Borneo competitor at the 1956 Summer Olympics
 Soong Fie Cho – badminton player, born in Lahad Datu
 Stacy – singer and songwriter, born in Penampang
 Stephen R. Evans – British descent politician, public administrator and book author
 Sukarti Wakiman – Secretary of State of Sabah
 Sumardi Hajalan – footballer, born in Tawau

T 
 Tawfiq Titingan – politician, former Sabah State Legislative Assemblyman for Apas in Tawau
 Tina Rimmer – British artist and the state first cultural icon. Firstly settled in Lahad Datu of North Borneo Crown with her husband Bert Rimmer in 1959 until his death. She then spent most of her life in Kota Kinabalu

U

V 
 Vountus Indra Mawan – badminton player

W 
 Wawa Zainal – actress and model, born in Lahad Datu
 Wendy Hutton – New Zealander food and travel book writers based in Sabah, spent most of her life in Kota Kinabalu
 Wilfred Bumburing – member of parliament for Tuaran, born in Tuaran
 Wilfred Madius Tangau – Malaysian Science, Technology and Innovation minister
 Wong Sze Phin – State Assistant Minister and former member of parliament for Kota Kinabalu
 Wong Tien Fatt – member of parliament for Sandakan

X

Y 
 Yau-Man Chan – Malaysian-American table tennis player, born in Hong Kong and raised in Kota Kinabalu
 Yong Teck Lee – 10th Chief Minister of Sabah, born in Lahad Datu
 Yong Vui Kong – drug courier who was given life imprisonment in Singapore for trafficking heroin, born in Sandakan
 Yussof Mahal – former member of parliament for Labuan, born during Labuan was still part of North Borneo Crown

Z 
 Zainizam Marjan – footballer, brother of Matlan Marjan, born in Kota Belud
 Zaykiel Leong – footballer
 Zuraindey Jumai – footballer, born in Tuaran

See also 
 Demographics of Sabah

References 

 
Sabah